The Bolivia women's national basketball team represents the Bolivia in international competitions. It is administered by the Federación Boliviana de Básquetbol (FBB).

They won the silver medal at the 1978 South American Basketball Championship for Women.

See also
 Bolivia women's national under-19 basketball team
 Bolivia women's national under-17 basketball team
 Bolivia women's national 3x3 team
 Bolivia men's national basketball team

External links
Official Website
Latinbasket.com - Bolivia Women National Team
Archived records of Bolivia team participations

References

 
Women's national basketball teams